Cynaeda affinis is a moth in the family Crambidae. It was described by Rothschild in 1915. It is found in Algeria.

The wingspan is about 16 mm. The basal three-fourths of the forewings is cream, powdered with olive-brown. The outer one-quarter is pale blue-grey with a black subterminal line. The hindwings are yellowish wood-grey. Adults have been recorded on wing in April.

References

Moths described in 1915
Odontiini